The Ministry of Trade of Iraq is a conglomeration of state-owned enterprises and operates a nearly $6bn annual budget that provides a monthly public food distribution program for Iraqis. This conglomerate also manages the import of grain, seeds, and construction materials.

While Iraq is a potentially wealthy country due to huge oil deposits, decades of wars and sanctions have led to the collapse of infrastructure and social services. 
These occurrences have resulted in many people being left without sufficient food or nutrition. A 2008 survey estimated that 930,000 Iraqis were food insecure, with an additional 6.4 million vulnerable to food security without the Public Distribution System (PDS).

History
Iraq's food rationing system was established in 1995 as part of the United Nations Oil-for-Food Programme following Iraq's invasion of Kuwait. Under the Public Distribution System (PDS) every Iraqi, irrespective of income level, is entitled to a monthly food ration for a nominal fee. Most of the Ministry's 3000 trucks and 400 warehouses are dedicated to the PDS. However, the programme has been plagued by mismanagement and corruption since the 2003 US-led invasion.  With annual costs running at more than US$4 billion, the Iraqi government is looking at ways to reform the system to target only the most vulnerable people in need of such assistance.

Anti-corruption officials and the Iraqi army went to the ministry's offices in central Baghdad on April 29, 2009 to detain nine people on corruption charges. Their attempted roundup triggered a 15-minute gunfight between the military and the minister's security team. Only the minister's spokesman, Mohammed Hanoun was detained. Two of Sudani's brothers, one who worked for the ministry and one who headed the Iraqi Grain Board, were arrested the following day.

In May 2009 Iraqi Trade Minister Abdel Falah al-Sudani resigned and was later arrested amid allegations of corruption and embezzlement linked to the nation's food assistance programme. Sudani, a member of Prime Minister Nouri al-Maliki's Shiite Dawa faction, had been questioned by parliament over claims relating to imports for Iraq's food rationing programme. The minister was accused of importing expired commodities—sugar—and procuring illegal contracts as well as failing to fight corruption in his ministry.

In December 2009 the United Nations World Food Programme and Iraqi Ministry of Trade signed a 'Memorandum of Understanding' under which the two parties agreed to work together to improve the supply chain management of the Public Distribution System (PDS) which provides a monthly food ration to millions of Iraqis. The agreement was signed in Baghdad by Edward Kallon and the Iraqi Minister of Trade, Dr Safa Al-Deen Alsafi.

Mission statement
The official stated purpose of the Iraqi Ministry of Trade is to facilitate and promote trade and commerce in Iraq.  It aims to encourage private sector development by removing regulations blocking trade and investment, eliminating import licensing rules, and embarking on wide-ranging projects to promote a new trading environment in Iraq: an anti-corruption drive, a consumer welfare and protection unit, a “Baghdad International Fair" site and the leasing of Iraqi shopping centers to private developers.

Associated companies
The Iraqi Ministry of Trade has number of associated State Companies: Iraqi Fairs, Food Stuff Trading, Constructions Stuff Trading, Grains Production, Grains Trading, Central Markets and Vehicles and Machines Trading. In addition, there are also a number of 'directorates' for Private Sector Development, Planning and Purveying, Administrative and Financial Affairs, Economic and Foreign Affairs and the Registration of Companies Department.

Establishments

List of countries with an Iraqi Commercial Attache

	Iraqi Commercial Attaché Bulgaria
	Iraqi Commercial Attaché China
	Iraqi Commercial Attaché Egypt
	Iraqi Commercial Attaché France
	Iraqi Commercial Attaché India
	Iraqi Commercial Attaché Italy
	Iraqi Commercial Attaché Japan
	Iraqi Commercial Attaché Jordan
	Iraqi Commercial Attaché Russia
	Iraqi Commercial Attaché Tunis
	Iraqi Commercial Attaché Turkey
	Iraqi Commercial Attaché UK
	Iraqi Commercial Attaché USA

External links
 Iraq Ministry of Trade official website

References

Iraq
trade